Ugly Nasty People is a 2017 Italian heist comedy film directed by Cosimo Gomez.

Cast
Claudio Santamaria as The Duck
Marco D'Amore as Giorgio Armani, aka "Shit"
Sara Serraiocco as Ballerina
Simoncino Martucci as Plissé
Narcisse Mame as Don Charles	
Aline Belibi as Perla 
Giorgio Colangeli as Commissioner Parisi
Filippo Dini as The Chicken
Rosa Canova as Katia 
Fabiano Lioi as Senna  	
Maria Chiara Augenti as Mimma 
Adamo Dionisi as Walter Masini 
Rinat Khismatouline as Borush 
Yang Shi as Shi Juan
Guo Qiang Xu as Boss Shi Peijun

References

External links

2017 films
2010s Italian-language films
2017 comedy films
Italian comedy films
Italian heist films
2010s Italian films